Gran Bahía Blanca (Greater Bahía Blanca) is the name given to the large urban conurbation around the city of Bahía Blanca in Buenos Aires Province, Argentina. The 2001 Census estimated the population of Gran Bahía Blanca as 274,509 making it the 17th largest urban conurbation in Argentina.

Notes

Bahia Blanca
Geography of Buenos Aires Province
Bahía Blanca